Arti Sharma (born 5 April 1985) Known as Arti Singh  is an Indian television actress. She is known for her work in Thoda Hai Bas Thode Ki Zaroorat Hai, Parichay and Waaris. In 2019, she participated in Bigg Boss 13 as a contestant and became fourth runner-up.

Early life
Aarti Singh was born on 5 April 1985. in Lucknow to Himachali father Atmaprakash Sharma and mother Padma. She is the niece of Actor Govinda (actor), sister of Comedian Krushna Abhishek and cousin of television actress Ragini Khanna and Soumya Seth. She belongs to the Govinda Family in the Bollywood Industry.

Career
Singh started her acting career with the Zee TV show Maayka where she portrayed the role of Soni in 2007. She later was seen playing Rano in Star Plus's show Grihasti followed by Thoda Hai Bas Thode Ki Zaroorat Hai as Mugda.

In 2011, she portrayed the role of Seema in Ekta Kapoor's show Parichay — Nayee Zindagi Kay Sapno Ka. She later portrayed the role of Kajri in Colors TV's Uttaran. In 2014, she appeared in the show Devon Ke Dev...Mahadev as Baani and later participated in the reality show Box Cricket League.

After appearing in comedy shows Killerr Karaoke Atka Toh Latkah, Comedy Classes and Comedy Nights Bachao, she played the role of a ghost in Sasural Simar Ka in 2016. She later was seen as the main lead in &TV's Waaris as Amba from 2016 to 2017.

In 2019, she participated in the reality show Bigg Boss 13 and emerged as fourth runner-up. In this show, She revealed that she suffered depression due to lack of work for 2 years.

Television

References

External links

 
 
 

Living people
Indian television actresses
Bigg Boss (Hindi TV series) contestants
1985 births